Kotelnoye is a rural locality (a settlement) in Pogorelovskoye Rural Settlement, Totemsky District, Vologda Oblast, Russia. The population was 56 as of 2002. There are 2 streets.

Geography 
Kotelnoye is located 61 km southwest of Totma (the district's administrative centre) by road. Svetitsa is the nearest rural locality.

References 

Rural localities in Totemsky District